

Events

Works published
The chansonnier (song book) known as troubadour manuscript "D" was assembled in Lombardy. It is one of the earliest of its kind, containing a wealth of Occitan lyric poetry. It is now in the Biblioteca Estense in Modena under "α, R.4.4".

Births

Deaths

13th-century poetry
Poetry